Chuan Wen-sheng (born 13 July 1959) is a Taiwanese politician.

Education
Chuan graduated from what became Chung Shan Medical University.

Political career
Chuan was mayor of Xinyi Township in Nantou County for two terms prior to his 1995 election to the Legislative Yuan as a member of the Kuomintang representing the Highland Aborigine district. He lost reelection in 1999, and ran again in 2001. During his unsuccessful 2001 legislative campaign, Chuan was indicted for vote buying, as were fellow candidates Hsiao-Chin-lan, Hsu Chih-ming, and Wang Tien-ching.

References

1959 births
Living people
Aboriginal Members of the Legislative Yuan
Kuomintang Members of the Legislative Yuan in Taiwan
Members of the 3rd Legislative Yuan
Mayors of places in Taiwan
Bunun people
Chung Shan Medical University alumni